Actinoschoenus arthrostyloides, commonly known as hairy actinoschoenus, is flowering plant in the sedge family, Cyperaceae, that is native to Western Australia throughout parts of the Kimberley region.

The species was first described in 1918 by William Vincent Fitzgerald as Fimbristylis arthrostyloides, but was transferred to the genus, Actinoschoenus, in 2015 by Kerri Clarke, Karen Wilson, and Jeremy Bruhl.

Etymology
The epithet is from the genus Arthrostylis R.Br. with the Greek termination -oides (like), in reference to the similar appearance of this species to that genus.

Description
Culms are  diameter, overall shape in Terminal spikelets(TS) ± terete but strongly and obtusely 5(6)-ridged, densely covered by short hairs and with much longer hairs scattered along the ridges. For the  inflorescence, a head of (1)2–7 somewhat spreading spikelets. For stamens, there are usually 3; anther is m long. C3 photosynthetic pathway is inferred from the anatomy. Flowers and fruits are recorded in February and from May to August.

Diagnostic characters: Culms densely hairy, displaying 2 hair types, obtusely 5(6)-ridged. Inflorescence (1–)2–7 spikelets; bracts 2–5, the basal bract longest.

Conservation status
It is currently known from thirteen locations in Western Australia and six in the adjacent Northern Territory, and sufficiently widespread not to require listing as a priority species.

Distribution
Occurs in open woodland with shrubs on sand associated with sandstone, sometimes occurring on the edges of pools. From the Kimberley region, extending from Mitchell Plateau and Boongaree Island south to near Walcott Inlet, east to Bullo River in the Northern Territory.

Here are the classifications of regions the species are found:

Beard’s Provinces: Northern Province.

IBRA regions: Northern Kimberley.

IBRA subregions: Mitchell.

IMCRA regions: Kimberley.

Local Government Areas (LGAs): Derby/west Kimberley, Wyndham-East Kimberley.

References

arthrostyloides
Plants described in 1918
Angiosperms of Western Australia
Taxa named by William Vincent Fitzgerald
Taxa named by Karen Louise Wilson